The 1974 New Hampshire Wildcats football team represented the University of New Hampshire in the 1974 NCAA Division II football season. They were led by third-year head coach Bill Bowes and finished the season 5–4 overall and 3–3 in the Yankee Conference, placing in a four-way tie for third.

Schedule

References

New Hampshire
New Hampshire Wildcats football seasons
New Hampshire Wildcats football